Nicolas Cage is an American actor and producer who began his acting career in 1981 with a role in the television pilot The Best of Times. The following year, Cage made his feature film acting debut in Fast Times at Ridgemont High, the second and last time he was credited by his birth name Nicolas Coppola; he later changed his name professionally to avoid allegations of nepotism due to his connection to the Coppola family. In 1983, Cage starred in a leading role in the teen romantic comedy Valley Girl alongside Deborah Foreman; the film was praised by critics and summarized by Rotten Tomatoes as a "goofy yet amiable film" with "engaging performances from its two leads."

In 1984, Cage portrayed a fictionalized version of Irish-American mob hitman Mad Dog Coll ("Vincent Dwyer") in The Cotton Club and appeared in Birdy, a feature chosen by the National Board of Review as one of the top ten films of that year. In 1986, he starred as Ned Hanlan in The Boy in Blue and Charlie Bodell in Peggy Sue Got Married before leading the crime comedy Raising Arizona (1987), written and directed by the Coen brothers. In 1988, he earned a Golden Globe nomination for Best Actor – Motion Picture Musical or Comedy for his role in Moonstruck. In 1989, he appeared in the black comedy film Vampire's Kiss, a box-office bomb that later gained a cult following; The New York Times described it as being "dominated and destroyed by Mr. Cage's chaotic, self-indulgent performance".

In 1992, Cage earned his second Golden Globe nomination for Honeymoon in Vegas. Three years later, he starred as a suicidal alcoholic in the critically acclaimed Leaving Las Vegas. For his performance, he received a BAFTA Award nomination for Best Actor in a Leading Role. He also earned the Golden Globe for Best Actor – Motion Picture Drama and the Academy Award for Best Actor. In 2002, he made his directorial debut with Sonny and portrayed filmmaker Charlie Kaufman in Adaptation, another critically acclaimed film that earned him his most recent Best Actor nominations from the Academy Awards, BAFTA, and Golden Globes.

Since then, Cage has had roles in a number of action and drama films, some of which were straight-to-video. His participation in various film genres during this time increased his popularity and gained him a cult following. The Guardian writes, "In Cage's hands, cartoonish moments are imbued with real emotion and real emotions become cartoons. He is erratic and unpredictable; he is captivating and he is capricious. He is a performer. He is a troubadour. He is a jazz musician." In 2013, he voiced Grug in the animated film The Croods, his highest-grossing film. His additional voice roles include Superman in Teen Titans Go! To the Movies and Spider-Man Noir in Spider-Man: Into the Spider-Verse (both 2018). Cage has also starred in several critically acclaimed films, including Mandy (2018), Color Out of Space (2019), and Pig (2021).

Film

Television

References

External links
 
 

American filmographies
Male actor filmographies